Emma's War is a 1987 Australian drama film starring Miranda Otto and Lee Remick. Clytie Jessop made her debut directing, producing and writing this film. It was completed in 1986, and released there in 1988. This was the last feature film for Remick and David Cahill.

Cast
 Lee Remick as Anne Grange
 Miranda Otto as Emma Grange
 Mark Lee as John Davidson
 Terence Donovan as Frank Grange
 Donal Gibson as Hank
 Bridey Lee as Laurel Grange
 Pat Evison as Miss Arnott
 Grigor Taylor as Dr. Friedlander
 Noeline Brown as Mrs. Mortimer
 Rebel Russell as Miss Gunz
 Mervyn Drake as Iceman
 Ashley Grenville as Brian
 Kay Eklund as Miss Clewes
 Jean Calver as Old Woman, Grog Shop
 David Cahill as Headmaster, Country School

References

External links
 Emma's War at IMDb
 Emma's War at Oz Movies

Australian drama films
1980s English-language films
1987 films
1987 drama films
1980s Australian films